Shah Hussain Express, previously known as Night Coach Express, is a passenger train operated daily by Pakistan Railways and Shalimar Group between Karachi and Lahore, The trip takes approximately 18 hours to cover a published distance of , traveling along a stretch of the Karachi–Peshawar Railway Line, Khanewal–Wazirabad Branch Line and Shahdara Bagh–Sangla Hill Branch Line.

By 13 January 2018, Pakistan Railways has taken unconditional control of Shah Hussain Express 43UP/44DN.

By 15 October 2018, Pakistan Railways changed its name to Shah Hussain Express from Night Coach Express

Route
 Karachi Cantonment–Khanewal Junction via Karachi–Peshawar Railway Line
 Khanewal Junction–Sangla Hill Junction via Khanewal–Wazirabad Branch Line
 Sangla Hill Junction–Shahdara Bagh Junction via Shahdara Bagh–Sangla Hill Branch Line
 Shahdara Bagh Junction–Lahore Junction via Karachi–Peshawar Railway Line

Station stops
Karachi Cantonment
Hyderabad Junction
Rohri Junction
Bahawalpur
Multan Cantonment
Khanewal Junction
Faisalabad
Lahore Junction

Equipment
The Shah Hussain Express consists of 2 AC Lower carriages, 1 AC Sleeper carriage, 7 Economy carriages as well as a dining carriage, power van and luggage van.
yfgg fudgh

References

Named passenger trains of Pakistan
Passenger trains in Pakistan